Han Wang-Yong (born 1966) is a South Korean mountaineer.  He has climbed the 14 tallest mountains in the world, collectively known as the eight-thousanders mountains.

Early life
Han was born in Okgu, Gunsan, Jeollabuk-do, the youngest son in a family of three sons and two daughters. He represented his middle school in football and his high school in baseball.

Career
In 2003, he became the 11th person to climb the 14 highest mountains eight-thousanders, and the third Korean climber to do so (behind Um Hong-gil and Park Young-seok). Since then he has led expeditions to clean rubbish left by other climbers from the slopes of K2 and Everest.

References

1966 births
Living people
People from Gunsan
South Korean mountain climbers
South Korean summiters of Mount Everest
Summiters of all 14 eight-thousanders
Sportspeople from North Jeolla Province